The Big Hunt is a novel by Lance Parkin, featuring Bernice Summerfield, a character from the spin-off media based on the long-running British science fiction television series Doctor Who.

Synopsis
Professor Summerfield is trying to enjoy a vacation from work, the Braxiatel Collection and even from her friends, Jason, Adrian and Peter. To her exasperation, she is sent on yet another mission. This task goes badly when she crash-lands on a planet full of hostile robotic animals, big game hunters and amoral businessmen.

Bernice soon realizes her only hope for survival is join in on the planet's 'game'.

Chronological Placement
The events in this novel take place after the audio drama and prior to the short story anthology.

External links
Big Finish Productions - Bernice Summerfield: The Big Hunt

2004 British novels
Bernice Summerfield novels
Big Finish New Worlds
Novels by Lance Parkin